Paper Castles is a 2009 Spanish romantic drama film directed by  from a screenplay by Enrique Urbizu based on the novel Castillos de cartón by Almudena Grandes. It stars Adriana Ugarte, Nilo Mur, and Biel Durán.

Plot 
Set in Madrid in the 1980s, the plot concerns about the love triangle between three art students, María José, Marcos, and Jaime.

Cast

Production 
Based on the novel by Almudena Grandes, the adapted screenplay was penned by Enrique Urbizu. The film was produced by Tornasol Films and Castafiore Films, and it had the participation of TVE and Canal+. Filming began at Alicante's Ciudad de la Luz studio in June 2008.

Release 
The film premiered at the 54th Valladolid International Film Festival (Seminci) on 25 October 2009. Distributed by Alta Classics, it was theatrically released in Spain on 30 October 2009.

Reception 
Oskar L. Belategui of El Correo considered that "afflicted with a languid rhythm and a lacerating visual poverty", the film fails both as "a moral tale and as a story of initiation".

Jonathan Holland of Variety assessed that the film feels as "flimsy as its title" and cannot be saved from Urbizu's "uncharacteristically overwrought" script, best efforts from the three leads notwithstanding.

Javier Cortijo of ABC considered that "a certain mechanical callousness threatens to derail" the film, "which is still estimable."

 of El País found the film to be "one of the least sexual movies with the most sex that [he] remembers watching", citing "the praiseworthy effort of swimming against inertia and commonplace".

See also 
 List of Spanish films of 2009

References 

Films based on Spanish novels
2009 romantic drama films
Spanish romantic drama films
2000s Spanish films
2000s Spanish-language films
Tornasol Films films
Films shot at Ciudad de la Luz
Films set in Madrid
Films set in the 1980s